Franciscan Health Lafayette, formerly Franciscan St. Elizabeth Health, is a member of the Franciscan Health hospital system. Formed in 1998, the organization owns and operates Franciscan Health Lafayette Central and Franciscan Health Lafayette East hospitals, both in Lafayette, Indiana, as well as Franciscan Health Crawfordsville. It formerly operated Lafayette Home Hospital until its closure in February 2010.

The organization is licensed by the Indiana State Board of Health and is a member of the Catholic Health Association of the United States, the Indiana Hospital Association, and the American Hospital Association.

It previously operated as Greater Lafayette Health Services, Inc. (GLHS) and St. Elizabeth Regional Health.

Closures and new construction
SERH announced in late 2005 that it planned to construct a new 150-bed acute care hospital to be built along Creasy Road on the city's east side.  Site preparation for the new facility began on October 13, 2006, and building construction began in spring 2007. Formerly named St. Elizabeth East, the facility opened February 25, 2010. More information is available at www.ste.org

References
Franciscan Health News Releases
Journal and Courier, October 12, 2006

External links
Franciscan Health Lafayette

Companies based in Indiana
Tippecanoe County, Indiana
Catholic hospital networks in the United States
Catholic health care
Catholic hospitals in North America